The Vault of Horror was an American bi-monthly horror comic anthology series published by EC Comics in the early 1950s. Along with Tales from the Crypt and The Haunt of Fear, it formed a trifecta of popular EC horror anthologies. The Vault of Horror hit newsstands with its April/May 1950 issue and ceased publication with its December/January 1955 issue, producing a total of 40 issues.

Origin
In 1950, William Gaines and his editor Al Feldstein discovered they shared similar tastes in horror and began experimenting with such stories in EC's crime comic War Against Crime and its companion title, Crime Patrol. With issue #12 the War Against Crime title was replaced with The Vault of Horror. Due to an attempt to save money on second-class postage permits, characteristic of comics publishing of the era, the numbering did not change with the title; the first issue of The Vault of Horror was thus labelled "No. 12". There is, however, evidence of an intention to reset the series' numbering with the fourth issue (#15), as was done with The Haunt of Fear (the numbering of which was reset, yet also "continued" by Two-Fisted Tales: a few copies survive of the first issue of Crime SuspenStories with a different indicia on the inside front cover. As the Overstreet Comic Book Price Guide explains: "#15 (formerly The Vault of Horror)" printed and blackened out on inside front cover with "Vol.1, No.1" printed over it. Evidently, several of No.15 were printed before a decision was made not to drop the Vault of Horror and Haunt of Fear series. The print run was stopped on No.15 and continued on No.1. All of the No.15 issues were changed as described above."

Artists and writers
Like its horror companion titles, Tales from the Crypt and The Haunt of Fear, The Vault of Horror had its own distinctive qualities and atmosphere—in this case, created by its main artist, Johnny Craig. Craig illustrated all the covers for the entire run and was responsible for the lead story of all but issues #13 and #33. He also wrote all his own stories (save two) in Vault, something rarely done at EC, and became editor with issue #35 (February, 1954). Gaines and Feldstein wrote almost every other story until late 1953/early 1954 when outside writers Carl Wessler and Jack Oleck were brought in. Other contributing artists to The Vault of Horror were Feldstein, George Evans, Jack Kamen, Wally Wood, Graham Ingels, Harvey Kurtzman, Jack Davis, Sid Check, Al Williamson, Joe Orlando, Reed Crandall, Bernard Krigstein, Harry Harrison and Howard Larsen.

Influences and adaptations 
As with the other EC comics edited by Feldstein, the stories in this comic were primarily based on Gaines using existing horror stories and films to develop "springboards" from which he and Feldstein could launch new stories. Specific story influences that have been identified include the following:

"Portrait in Wax" (issue 12) – Michael Curtiz's The Mystery of the Wax Museum
"Doctor of Horror" (issue 13)- Robert Louis Stevenson's "The Body Snatcher"
"Island of Death" (issue 13) – Richard Connell's "The Most Dangerous Game"
"Fitting Punishment" (issue 16) – H. P. Lovecraft's "In the Vault"
"Terror on the Moors" (issue 17) – Clark Ashton Smith's "The Nameless Offspring"
"Baby It's Cold Inside" (issue 17) – H. P. Lovecraft's "Cool Air"
"Voodoo Horror" (issue 17) – Oscar Wilde's "The Picture of Dorian Gray"
"The Mask of Horror" (issue 18) – Robert Bloch's "The Cloak"
"The Jellyfish" (issue 19) – Ray Bradbury's "Skeleton"
"Daddy Lost His Head" (issue 19) – Robert Bloch's "Sweets to the Sweet"
"Grandma's Ghost" (issue 20) – Stephen Grendon's "Mr. George"
"The Monster in the Ice" (issue 22) – Christian Nyby's The Thing from Another World
"What the Dog Dragged In" (issue 22) – Ray Bradbury's "The Emissary"
"We Ain't Got No Body" (issue 28) – Clark Ashton Smith's "The Return of the Sorcerer"
"Star Light, Star Bright" (issue 34) – Carl Theodor Dreyer's Vampyr

After their unauthorized adaptation of one of Ray Bradbury's stories in another magazine, Bradbury contacted EC about their plagiarism of his work. They reached an agreement for EC to do authorized versions of Bradbury's short fiction.  These official adaptations include:

"Let's Play Poison" (issue 29)
"The Lake" (issue 31)

The Vault-Keeper

Although EC's horror stable consisted of three separate magazines, there was little beyond their titles to distinguish them.  Each magazine had its titular host, but the hosting duties for any one issue were typically shared with the hosts of the other two.  Thus, a single issue of The Vault of Horror would contain two stories told by the Vault-Keeper, one by the Crypt-Keeper (of Tales from the Crypt) and one by the Old Witch (of The Haunt of Fear).  The professional rivalry between these three GhoulLunatics was often played for comic effect.

The Vault-Keeper was the primary host of The Vault of Horror.  He was introduced to the public in War against Crime #10, and he continued in that magazine through its change in title and format.  He was a frightening presence in those early issues, an ancient inquisitor, hooded and robed, presiding over the empty dungeon of his bloody past.  But he soon evolved into a more comedic horror host, delivering an irreverent and pun-filled commentary to lighten the horrific tone of the stories he introduced.

Demise

Reprints
The Vault of Horror has been reprinted on numerous occasions. Ballantine Books reprinted selected Vault stories in a series of paperback EC anthologies in 1964–66. Other Vault stories were reprinted in Horror Comics of the 1950s by Nostalgia Press (1971), edited by Bhob Stewart and Ron Barlow. Publisher Russ Cochran released six issues of his EC Portfolio (1971–77). East Coast Comix reprinted issue #26 in the early 1970s. The magazine was fully collected in a series of five black-and-white hardbacks by Cochran as part of The Complete EC Library in the early 1980s. Cochran also reprinted the title in a standard comic book format (out of sequence) during the early 1990s in association with Gladstone Publishing. Cochran eventually reprinted the run in proper sequence during the later 1990s with Gemstone Publishing. This complete run was later rebound, with covers included, in a series of six softcover EC Annuals. In 2007, Cochran and Gemstone began to publish hardcover, re-colored volumes of The Vault of Horror as part of the EC Archives series. One volume (of a projected five) was published by Gemstone before their financial troubles left the project in limbo. A second volume was published by GC Press LLC, a boutique imprint established by Russ Cochran and Grant Geissman, in January 2012. But the project may soon be revived under a new publisher, since Dark Horse Comics has announced plans to resume it with the release of The Vault of Horror Volume 3 in January 2014.

Media adaptations
The Vault of Horror story And All Through the House (#35) was adapted to motion picture in Freddie Francis' Tales from the Crypt (1972). The 1973 film The Vault of Horror is titled after this comic, but no stories from this comic were actually adapted for this film.

Vault stories were also adapted for the Tales from the Crypt television series that aired on HBO (1989). The following stories were used in the television series: Horror in the Night (Issue #12), Doctor of Horror (#13),  Report from the Grave (#15), Fitting Punishment (#16), Werewolf Concerto (#16), Revenge Is the Nuts (#20), The Reluctant Vampire (#20), Dead Wait (#23), Staired in Horror (#23), 99 & 44/100% Pure Horror (#23), Collection Completed (#25), Seance (#25), Half-Way Horrible (#26), People Who Live in Brass Hearses (#27),  'Til Death (#28), Split Personality (#30), Easel Kill Ya (#31), Whirlpool (#32), Strung Along (#33), Let The Punishment Fit The Crime (#33), A Slight Case of Murder (#33), Smoke Wrings (#34), And All Through the House (#35), Beauty Rest (#35), Surprise Party (#37), Top Billing (#39) and The Pit (#40).

The Vault-Keeper appeared as a character in the 1993 animated series Tales from the Cryptkeeper and was voiced by David Hemblen.

In 2019, American audio production company Pocket Universe Productions, of which the AudioComics Company (producers of the Locke & Key and The X-Files audio dramas for Audible Studios) is a division, released the first season of "EC Comics Presents The Vault of Horror", a full-cast audio drama adapting the first 24 stories from the first six issues of the original comics (issues 12 – 17). Featuring a cast of more than 60 actors, including Philip Proctor, co-founder of the Firesign Theatre and Denise Poirier, best known for playing the character of Æon Flux in the MTV animated series, the role of the Vault-Keeper was voiced by actor, screenwriter, and comic book writer   Kevin Grevioux, creator of the Underworld film series.

The complete 8+ hour audio drama was released in audiobook format on October 25, 2019, then as a podcast in March of 2020, and was adapted by Lance Roger Axt and Butch D'Ambrosio, and produced by Axt, Jonathan Woodward, and William Dufris, who also directed (the production being Dufris' final audio drama production before his death from cancer).

Issue guide

References

Sources
Goulart, Ron. Great American Comic Books. Publications International, Ltd., 2001. .
Overstreet, Robert L. Official Overstreet Comic Book Price Guide. House of Collectibles, 2004.

Comics magazines published in the United States
EC Comics publications
1950 comics debuts
1955 comics endings
Fantasy comics
Horror comics
Tales from the Crypt
American comics adapted into films
Comics adapted into television series
Comics about magic
Comics by Carl Wessler
Comics by Gardner Fox
Vampires in comics
Werewolf comics
Zombies in comics
Magazines established in 1950
Magazines disestablished in 1955